The 2015 Kentucky gubernatorial election took place on November 3, 2015. Incumbent Democratic Governor Steve Beshear was ineligible to run for a third term due to term limits. Primary elections were held on May 19, 2015. Despite trailing in most pre-election polls, Republican nominee Matt Bevin defeated Democratic nominee Jack Conway by a margin of 52.5% to 43.8% in the general election. Statewide turnout in this election was 30%. With a margin of 8.7%, this election was the closest race of the 2015 gubernatorial election cycle.

Background
Kentucky governor Steve Beshear was first elected in 2007. An attorney, he served as a state representative, attorney general, lieutenant governor, ran unsuccessfully for the United States Senate, and he had reputation for being a moderate liberal.

Democratic primary

Candidates

Declared
 Jack Conway, Attorney General of Kentucky (2008–2016) and nominee for the U.S. Senate in 2010
 Running mate: Sannie Overly, state representative
 Geoff Young, retired engineer and candidate for Kentucky's 6th congressional district in 2014
 Running mate: Johnathan Masters
 Former running mate: Cherokee Schill

Declined
 Jerry Abramson, White House Director of Intergovernmental Affairs, former lieutenant governor of Kentucky and former mayor of Louisville
 Rocky Adkins, Majority Leader of the Kentucky House of Representatives
 Ben Chandler, former U.S. Representative, former attorney general of Kentucky and nominee for governor in 2003
 Luther Deaton, banker
 Adam Edelen, State Auditor of Kentucky (ran for re-election)
 Greg Fischer, Mayor of Louisville
 Alison Lundergan Grimes, Secretary of State of Kentucky and nominee for the U.S. Senate in 2014 (ran for re-election)
 Crit Luallen, Lieutenant Governor of Kentucky and former state auditor of Kentucky
 Daniel Mongiardo, former Lieutenant Governor of Kentucky and nominee for the U.S. Senate in 2004
 Greg Stumbo, Speaker of the Kentucky House of Representatives, former attorney general of Kentucky and candidate for lieutenant governor in 2007
 John Yarmuth, U.S. Representative

Endorsements

Polling

Results

Republican primary

Candidates

Declared
 Matt Bevin, businessman and candidate for U.S. Senate in 2014
 Running mate: Jenean Hampton, former Chairwoman of the Bowling Green/Southern Kentucky Tea Party and nominee for the 20th Kentucky House district in 2014
 James Comer, Agriculture Commissioner of Kentucky, 2012–2016; and former state representative, 2001-2012
 Running mate: Christian McDaniel, state senator, 2013–present
 Hal Heiner, former member of the Louisville Metro Council, 2003–2010; and nominee for Mayor of Louisville in 2010
 Running mate: K.C. Crosbie, former Lexington-Fayette Urban County Councilwoman, 2006–2014; former finance chairwoman and national chairwoman for the Republican Party of Kentucky, and nominee for Kentucky State Treasurer in 2011
 Will T. Scott, former associate justice of the Kentucky Supreme Court, 2005–2015; nominee for Attorney General of Kentucky in 1995 and for KY-07 in 1988 and 1990
 Running mate: Rodney Coffey, former Menifee County Sheriff, 1999–2014; Kentucky Sheriffs Association President, 20142015

Withdrew
 Robert Lee Rosier, U.S. Army veteran
 Running mate: John Yuen, candidate for the State Senate in 2012

Declined
 Cathy Bailey, businesswoman and former United States Ambassador to Latvia
 Andy Barr, U.S. Representative
 Jess Correll, banker
 Richie Farmer, former Agriculture Commissioner of Kentucky
 Ernie Fletcher, former governor and former U.S. Representative
 Trey Grayson, former Secretary of State of Kentucky and candidate for the U.S. Senate in 2010
 Brett Guthrie, U.S. Representative
 Thomas Massie, U.S. Representative
 Mitch McConnell, U.S. Senator and Senate Majority Leader
 Phil Moffett, businessman, Tea Party activist and candidate for governor in 2011
 Rand Paul, U.S. Senator and 2016 presidential candidate
 David L. Williams, judge on the Kentucky Circuit Courts, former president of the Kentucky Senate and nominee for governor in 2011

Endorsements

Polling

Results

On May 19, 2015, Matt Bevin won the Republican primary, defeating second-place finisher James Comer by 83 votes.

Independents

Candidates

Declared
 Drew Curtis, entrepreneur and founder and CEO of Fark.com
 Running mate: Heather Curtis, COO of Fark.com and wife of Drew Curtis
 Gatewood Galbraith (formerly Terrill Wayne Newman), social worker (distinguish from politician Gatewood Galbraith)
 Running mate: Elisabeth Anderson, retired legal secretary

General election

Predictions

Polling

Conway vs. Bailey

 Conway vs. Comer

Conway vs. Heiner

Conway vs. Scott

 * Poll for the Kentucky Democratic Party

Results

References

External links
Matt Bevin for Governor
Jack Conway for Governor
Drew Curtis for Governor

Governor
Kentucky
November 2015 events in the United States
2015